Six Mile Lake (Hungry Bay) Water Aerodrome  is located on Six Mile Lake, Ontario, Canada and serves the community of Georgian Bay.

See also

 Six Mile Lake (South) Water Aerodrome

References

Registered aerodromes in Ontario
Seaplane bases in Ontario